Astrel Rolland (born 1899, date of death unknown) was an Olympic sport shooter who was part of the team that won Haiti's first Olympic medal—a bronze in team free rifle at the 1924 Summer Olympics.

References

1899 births
Year of death missing
Haitian male sport shooters
Olympic shooters of Haiti
Shooters at the 1924 Summer Olympics
Olympic bronze medalists for Haiti
Olympic medalists in shooting
Medalists at the 1924 Summer Olympics